= History of metal =

History of metal may refer to:

- Metallurgy#History
- Heavy metal music#History
